Mulan is a Disney media franchise that began in 1998 with the theatrical release of Mulan.

Films

Animated films

Mulan (1998)

Mulan is a 1998 American animated musical action-comedy-drama film produced by Walt Disney Animation Studios based on the Chinese legend of Hua Mulan. It is the 36th Disney animated feature film, and was released during the Disney Renaissance.

Mulan II

Mulan II is a 2004 American direct-to-video Disney animated film directed by Darrell Rooney and Lynne Southerland and is a sequel to the 1998 animated film Mulan.

Live-action films

Mulan (2020)

Walt Disney Pictures released a live-action version of Mulan produced by Chris Bender and J.C. Spink through their company Benderspink and directed by Niki Caro. The film stars Liu Yifei as the titular character,  Donnie Yen as Commander Tung,  Tzi Ma as Hua Zhou, Jason Scott Lee as Bori Khan, Yoson An as Chen Honghui, Rosalind Chao as Hua Li, Xana Tang as Hua Xiu, Ron Yuan as Sergeant Qiang Gong Li as Xian Lang and  Jet Li as The Emperor of China. Disney had scheduled the film to be released on March 27, but was later delayed to July 24, 2020, due to the COVID-19 pandemic. The film was delayed again to August 21, 2020. The film's theatrical release was canceled in the United States and would instead have its premiere for a premium fee on Disney+ on September 4, 2020. It was still released theatrically in countries where theaters re-opened, such as China, as well as in other countries that do not have Disney+. The film had its world premiere at the Dolby Theatre in Los Angeles on March 9, 2020. A sequel is in development.

Future
In April 2020, it was reported that a Mulan sequel is in development with Chris Bender, Jason T. Reed, and Jake Weiner returning as producers.

Television
Mulan never received a television series. However, the film's characters (usually the title character) have appeared in Disney's House of Mouse, Once Upon a Time, and Sofia the First.

Audiobook
In 1999, an audiobook was released on a cassette tape and read-along book.
On 1 January 2004, as part of Disney's Storyteller Series, Mulan was made into an hour long audio book read by Roy Dotrice.

Musical

Mulan Jr.

Mulan Jr. is a stage musical version of the 1998 Disney animated film Mulan. It features many new songs.

Video games

Mulan

Disney's Mulan is a game released on the Game Boy.

Disney's Animated Storybook: Mulan

Disney's Animated Storybook: Mulan is a game in the Disney's Animated Storybook series developed by Media Station, which retell the plot of Disney films in abridged and interactive storybook settings. It was released for Microsoft Windows, Macintosh, and PlayStation. The PlayStation version was released under the name Disney's Story Studio: Mulan, with the port developed by Revolution Software (under the name "Kids Revolution").

Kingdom Hearts series
Mushu appears in the first Kingdom Hearts video game and in Kingdom Hearts: Chain of Memories as a summon character. Kingdom Hearts II features a world based on the film, "The Land of Dragons", which includes several characters from the film, including Mulan as a party member.

Disney Infinity

Disney Infinity was an action-adventure toys-to-life video game series developed by Avalanche Software and published by Disney Interactive Studios that ran from 2013 to 2016. Mulan was referenced throughout the series via in-game toys and power discs. In the third and final game in the series, Disney Infinity 3.0, Mulan was released as a playable character for the game's Toy Box mode. Her figure was released on August 30, 2015, the same day the game was first released.

Disney Magic Kingdoms

In a limited time Event focused on Mulan, the world builder video game Disney Magic Kingdoms included Mulan, Li Shang and Mushu as playable characters, as well as some attractions based on locations of the film. Cri-Kee, Khan and Shan Yu were also included as playable characters in later updates. Costumes for Mulan based on her Warrior costume as Ping and her Comfy costume from Ralph Breaks the Internet are also available. All new content in the Mulan collection was included during Lunar Year celebrations.

Theme park attractions

Mulan Parade
The Mulan Parade in Disney's Hollywood Studios premiered on June 19, 1998, which was the same day the movie was released. Mostly using an instrumental of the song "Honor to Us All" (with some of "I'll Make a Man Out of You" thrown in) as the theme, it featured over 53 performers. The parade ended March 11, 2001 and was replaced by the "Stars and Motor Cars" parade. The parade included Mushu, a matchmaker, future brides, pagodas, a moongate, warriors, Shan Yu, the Great Wall, street performers, stiltwalkers, kung-fu performers, a Chinese lion,  Shang, Mulan, and The Emperor. The parade was replaced by Disney Stars and Motor Cars Parade. The Los Angeles Times wrote "The new parade emphasizes richly hued costumes, street choreography and story-telling floats instead of high-tech effects. Highlights include a giant carriage drawn by four huge Percheron horses, and a troupe of performers from Chinese circuses. Its budget is a fifth of what the much-hyped Light Magic parade wound up costing, and its advertising budget is zero."

Meet and greets
Mulan appears at all the Disney Parks as a meetable character, and is based in Adventureland. She is most often joined by Mushu and occasionally Li Shang.

Cast and characters

Music

Soundtracks

Mulan

Mulan: An Original Walt Disney Records Soundtrack is the soundtrack for the 1998 Disney animated feature film, Mulan. Released by Walt Disney Records on June 2, 1998, the album featured songs by Matthew Wilder and David Zippel, conducted by Paul Bogaev, and score composed and conducted by Jerry Goldsmith. Vocalists included Lea Salonga, Donny Osmond, 98 Degrees, Jaz Coleman, Stevie Wonder and Christina Aguilera. The album peaked at No. 24 on the Billboard 200 on July 18, 1998, concurrent to the film's run in theaters. No singles from the album charted on the Hot 100, although the Aguilera's cover of "Reflection", did reach number 19 on the Adult Contemporary chart.

 "Written in Stone"
 "Honor to Us All"
 "Reflection"
 "Keep 'Em Guessing"
 "I'll Make a Man Out of You"
 "A Girl Worth Fighting For"

Mulan II
Mulan II: Original Soundtrack is the soundtrack for the 2005 Disney animated sequel, Mulan II. Released by Walt Disney Records on January 25, 2005, the album was produced by Brian Rawling, Graham Stack, and Brett Swain, with all scores composed and conducted by Joel McNeely. The album features songs by Jeanine Tesori, Mathew Wilder, and Joel McNeely; lyrics composed by Alexa Junge, David Zippel, and Kate Light. Vocalists include Lea Salonga, Atomic Kitten, Harvey Fierstein, Jerry Tondo, Gedde Watanabe, Randy Crenshaw, Beth Blankenship, Mandy Gonzalez, Judy Kuhn, and Hayley Westenra. The soundtrack earned 3 out of 5 stars in professional ratings from AllMusic.

 "Lesson Number One"
 "Main Title"
 "Like Other Girls"
 "A Girl Worth Fighting For (Redux)"
 "Here Beside Me"
 "(I Wanna Be) Like Other Girls"
 "The Journey Begins"
 "In Love And In Trouble"
 "The Attack"
 "Shang Lives!"

References

 
Walt Disney Studios (division) franchises